Peschiera Borromeo is a comune (municipality) in the Metropolitan City of Milan in the Italian region Lombardy, located about  southeast of Milan. It received the honorary title of city with a presidential decree on August 6, 1988.
 
Peschiera Borromeo borders the following municipalities: Milan, Pioltello, Segrate, Rodano, Pantigliate, San Donato Milanese, Mediglia.

History

The land was owned by the House of Borromeo of San Miniato in the 14th century and possibly earlier.  Peschiera Borromeo's main attraction is the Borromeo Castle, built in 1437 by Vitaliano Borromeo.  The Borromei were, during the later years of the Ambrosian Republic, pro-Francesco Sforza, and housed him in the castle while he besieged Milan in 1450.  In 1461 Sforza, now the Duke of Milan, made Filippo Borromeo the Conte di Peschiera.

Peschiera was made a comune in 1863, and, partly to distinguish it from Peschiera del Garda and partly to honor the Borromeo Family, was given the full name Peschiera Borromeo.

References

External links
 Official website